Arno Van Keilegom (born 27 May 1999) is a Belgian professional footballer who plays as a midfielder for Eerste Divisie club Helmond Sport.

Career

Mechelen
Having previously played youth football for Lierse and Anderlecht, Van Keilegom started his senior career at Mechelen.

Loans
In January 2020, he joined Heist on loan until the end of the season. He scored on his debut for the club on 19 January 2021 in a 1–0 away win against Rupel Boom. He made 6 appearances for Heist, scoring one goal.

As part of an agreement between the two sides, Van Keilegom joined Dutch Eerste Divisie side Helmond Sport on loan in August 2020. He scored on his league debut for Helmond Sport with their second goal of a 2–1 win away to TOP Oss.

Helmond Sport
In April 2021, after a successful season with Helmond, Van Keilegom signed a permanent deal with the club; a three-year contract.

Career statistics

References

1999 births
Living people
People from Berlaar
Belgian footballers
Belgian expatriate footballers
Association football midfielders
Lierse S.K. players
R.S.C. Anderlecht players
K.V. Mechelen players
K.S.K. Heist players
Helmond Sport players
Belgian Third Division players
Eerste Divisie players
Expatriate footballers in the Netherlands
Belgian expatriate sportspeople in the Netherlands
Footballers from Antwerp Province